The 2022 European Le Mans Series was the nineteenth season of the Automobile Club de l'Ouest's (ACO) European Le Mans Series. The six-event season began at Circuit Paul Ricard on 17 April and finished at Algarve International Circuit on 16 October.

The series is open to Le Mans Prototypes, divided into the LMP2 and LMP3 classes, and grand tourer-style racing cars in the LMGTE class.

Calendar 
The provisional calendar for the 2022 season was announced on 17 September 2021. The Imola Circuit will return to the series after a 6-year absence, while the Red Bull Ring will not feature on the calendar. On 28 February 2022, it was announced that a round at the Hungaroring would be replaced by the Monza Circuit.

Entries

LMP2 
All cars in the LMP2 class use the Gibson GK428 V8 engine and Goodyear tyres. Entries in the LMP2 Pro-Am Cup, set aside for teams with a Bronze-rated driver in their line-up, are denoted with Icons.

 Augusto Farfus was scheduled to compete for BHK Motorsport, but did not appear at any rounds.

LMP3
All cars in the LMP3 class use the Nissan VK56DE 5.6L V8 engine and Michelin tyres.

LMGTE 
All cars in the LMGTE class use Goodyear tyres.

They were replaced by the #6 LMP3 Ligier of 360 Racing, originally a reserve entry.

Results and standings

Race results 
Bold indicates overall winner.

Drivers' Championships
Points are awarded according to the following structure:

LMP2 Drivers Championship

LMP2 Pro-Am Drivers Championship

LMP3 Drivers Championship

LMGTE Drivers Championship

Teams' Championships
Points are awarded according to the following structure:

LMP2 Teams Championship

LMP2 Pro-Am Teams Championship

LMP3 Teams Championship

LMGTE Teams Championship

Notes

References

External links
 

European Le Mans Series seasons
European Le Mans Series
Le Mans Series